The National Liberation Movement (MLN) was a political party in Burkina Faso.

History
The party was originally established by Joseph Ki-Zerbo in Dakar in Senegal in August 1958. Ki-Zerbo founded the party in order to campaign for a "no" vote in the constitutional referendum in September. After 99% of voters voted for the new constitution, Ki Zerbo moved to Guinea, the only country to oppose the constitution and subsequently become independent.

In 1970 Ki-Zerbo re-established the party to run in the parliamentary elections that year. It received 11% of the vote and won 6 of the 57 seats in the National Assembly.

The party was banned in 1974.

References

Defunct political parties in Burkina Faso
Political parties established in 1958
Political parties established in 1970
Political parties disestablished in 1974
1958 establishments in Upper Volta